Edin "Fićo" Bahtić (born 1 May 1956) is a Bosnian-Herzegovinian retired professional footballer who played as a midfielder.

He was nicknamed after the famous Yugoslav car Zastava 750 colloquially known as Fićo (replica of Fiat 500).

Club career
He started playing football for FK Željezničar youth team. At the time he was supposed to leave the youth squad, he was considered not to be a quality for Željezničar's first team. He left the club and played in amateur side FK Vraca in Sarajevo. He also played one season for Bosna Sarajevo before he was called to re-join FK Željezničar in 1978. He played almost 250 league games for the club until 1989. He also scored more than 60 league goals, despite he was not actually a striker. He usually played as a right winger. During 1985-86 and 1986-87 seasons he played for Greek side Aris Thessaloniki.

He was also a joint top-scorer of UEFA Cup 1984-85 with 7 goals alongside QPR's Gary Bannister. FK Željezničar reached the semifinals of UEFA Cup that season.

International career
Good games in FK Željezničar shirt were the reason he was called to play for Yugoslav national team. He made his debut for them in a September 1984 friendly match away against Scotland and earned a total of 2 caps, scoring no goals. His final international was a June 1985 FIFA World Cup qualification match against Bulgaria.

References

External links

Reprezentacija.rs profile

1956 births
Living people
Footballers from Sarajevo
Association football midfielders
Yugoslav footballers
Yugoslavia international footballers
FK Željezničar Sarajevo players
Aris Thessaloniki F.C. players
Yugoslav First League players
Super League Greece players
Yugoslav expatriate footballers
Expatriate footballers in Greece
Yugoslav expatriate sportspeople in Greece